Hrimthursum is the fifth full-length album by Swedish blackened death metal band Necrophobic. It was released on Regain Records in 2006.

Track listing

Personnel
Tobias Sidegård: Vocals, Sampling, Bass
Johan Bergebäck: Guitars
Sebastian Ramstedt: Guitars
Joakim Sterner: Drums

Production
Arranged by Necrophobic
Produced by Necrophobic, Fredrik Folkare and Anders Bentell
Recorded and engineered by Fredrik Folkare and Anders Bentell

References

External links
Official website: 
"Hrimthursum" recording details; scroll down 11 paragraphs

2006 albums
Necrophobic albums
Regain Records albums